Douglas Michael Fraser (born 8 December 1941 in Aberdeen) is a Scottish former football full-back.

Fraser began his career in Scottish minor football, appearing for Eaglesham Amateur and Blantyre Celtic. After being rejected by both Celtic and Leeds United, following trials Fraser turned professional with Aberdeen. Fraser's form attracted the attentions of English clubs and in September 1963 West Bromwich Albion manager Jimmy Hagan paid £23,000 for his signature. Making his debut against Birmingham City that same month, Fraser initially played in a number of defensive and midfield positions before making the right back slot his own. Fraser played in four cup finals during his time at The Hawthorns. His final Albion game was a 2–2 draw against Chelsea in November 1970 before manager Alan Ashman sold him to Nottingham Forest for £35,000. He would later play for Walsall where he hit the headlines after he was red carded for fighting with Bristol Rovers' Kenny Stephens - a former Albion teammate.

During his time with West Brom, Fraser made seven appearances for the Scotland national team. He made two appearances in 1968, against Cyprus and the Netherlands. The other five appearances were during a 1967 overseas tour that the Scottish Football Association decided in October 2021 to reclassify as full internationals, which increased Fraser's cap tally from two to seven. 

After his retirement from playing Fraser was appointed manager at Walsall, a position he held until 1977. Following this Fraser left football and took up a position as a prison guard at Nottingham Gaol.

See also
 List of Scotland national football team captains

References

1941 births
Living people
Scottish footballers
Scotland international footballers
Aberdeen F.C. players
West Bromwich Albion F.C. players
Nottingham Forest F.C. players
Walsall F.C. players
Walsall F.C. managers
Footballers from Aberdeen
Scottish Football League players
English Football League players
Association football fullbacks
Scottish football managers
Scotland under-23 international footballers
English Football League managers
FA Cup Final players
Blantyre Celtic F.C. players
Scottish Junior Football Association players